SS Esemplare was a small freighter built during the first decade of the 20th century. Completed in 1902, she was intended for the West African trade. Sold to an Italian company shortly before the beginning of the First World War in 1914, the ship was captured and scuttled by the German submarine SM UC-27 in August 1917.

Description 
She had a vertical triple-expansion steam engine driving a single screw propeller. The engine was rated at a total of 130 nominal horsepower and produced .

Construction and career 
Esemplare was laid down as yard number 366 by Anderson Rodger and Company at its shipyard in Port Glasgow, Scotland, for the Watson Steamship Co. The ship was launched on 30 October 1902 and completed on 22 November as Delamere. Named either for Delamere, Cheshire, or the Delamere Forest, she was sold to Joseph Constant on 8 January 1914. Twelve days later, the ship was sold to Alfio Napoli was registered in Catania, Italy, with the name Esemplare. The ship was captured by UC-27 at coordinates  on 7 July 1915 and scuttled.

References

Bibliography

Ships built on the River Clyde
Steamships of the United Kingdom
Maritime incidents in 1917
World War I merchant ships of Italy
1902 ships
Steamships of Italy